Indian Lake, also known as North Pond, is a lake located in northern Worcester, Massachusetts. The water is brownish in color with a transparency of only five feet. The mean and maximum depths are  respectively. The bottom is muck and rock. The shoreline is heavily developed with residential dwellings and commercial buildings.

Facilities
Shore Park (115 Shore Drive) offers a  beach that is open to the public July 1 to late August and offers a lifeguard from noon to 7 pm.

Wildlife
The fish population was most recently studied during a 1996 summer survey. Eleven species were collected including white perch, yellow perch, largemouth bass, golden shiner, black crappies, bluegills, pumpkinseeds, yellow bullhead, brown bullhead, carp and white suckers. Northern pike were captured during other sampling efforts in 1994. The lake has been stocked with northern pike and tiger muskies on a fairly regular basis beginning in 1981.

Boating
The north shore of Indian Lake was home to the Shore Park Community Sailing Club (SPCSC), which was directed by Paschal "Pat" Pavini who started the club in 1990. Eventually, the SPCSC evolved into the Indian Lake Yacht Club (ILYC). The club included youth and adult sailing programs as part of its offerings. In the late 1990s, the racing team from ILYC won the Gallagher Cup in Boston, emblematic of the Central Division Junior Championship. ILYC dissolved after Pat Pavini died in 2009. 

The public beach is owned by The City of Worcester and maintained by the Bancroft School and staffed by the Greendale YMCA during summer months.

References

Lakes of Worcester County, Massachusetts
Geography of Worcester, Massachusetts
Reservoirs in Massachusetts